Max W. Schmid was a Swiss rower who won the single scull event at the 1920 European Championships. He competed at the 1920 Summer Olympics but failed to reach the final. In 1925 he won a European silver medal in the double sculls, together with Rudolf Bosshard.

References

Year of birth missing
Year of death missing
Swiss male rowers
Olympic rowers of Switzerland
Rowers at the 1920 Summer Olympics
European Rowing Championships medalists
20th-century Swiss people